The Ceffyl Pren ("wooden horse") is a term referring to a former local form of punishment practiced in Welsh form of mob justice. It was a form of ritual humiliation in which offenders would be paraded around the village tied to a wooden frame, sometimes at night, by a mob carrying torches. The custom was similar to practices known in England as "rough music" or in Scotland as "riding the stang". It seems to have persisted until the mid 19th century.  In later times, an effigy was sometimes burned instead. The justice of the Ceffyl Pren was administered by a jury led by a foreman, with all of the men involved seeking anonymity through the use of blackened faces and female garb.  This bizarre tradition led to the adoption of "female impersonation" as one of the key features of the Rebecca Riots which swept across South and West Wales in the period 1839–1844 in protest against tollgate charges and the corruption of the Turnpike Trusts.

Adulterers, harsh landlords, the fathers of bastard children who hid behind the hated provisions of the 19th century Poor Law making the mother entirely responsible for her own predicament, all faced the frightening, embarrassing (and not infrequently painful) effects of these riotous affairs .Martha Morgan's Little World,pp 184-186, Brian John

References

Further reading

External links
 Judith Lloyd of Llanteg Historical Society writes about the 'Wooden Horse' 

Crime in Wales
History of Wales
Rebecca Riots